Yukiko Ogawa is a materials science researcher at the National Institute for Materials Science in Tsukuba, Ibaraki Prefecture, Japan. Ogawa’s research focuses on next-generation structural materials — particularly lightweight ones such as magnesium alloys — that show promising potential to improve fuel efficiency in vehicles, make electronic devices more portable and open up new possibilities in medical devices. The use of magnesium alloys has been limited as they are difficult to shape into new forms. But Ogawa succeeded in controlling the microstructure and mechanical properties of magnesium by heat treatment, which had previously been considered impossible. For her efforts in creating the next generation of smart materials, Ogawa was recognized as a 2018 L’Oréal-UNESCO For Women in Science International Rising Talent. Ogawa grew up in Komaki, Aichi Prefecture and studied engineering at Tohoku University in Sendai.

In her spare time, Ogawa enjoys reading novels, sewing, embroidery and painting. She also travels with her husband and family and visits hot springs.

Bibliography 

 Ogawa, Yukiko (2019). "Development of High Performance Magnesium Alloy Through Phase Transformation". Materia Japan. 58 (7): 395–400. doi:10.2320/materia.58.395. ISSN 1340-2625.
 Ogawa, Yukiko; Sutou, Yuji; Ando, Daisuke; Koike, Junichi (2018-05-30). "Aging precipitation kinetics of Mg-Sc alloy with bcc+hcp two-phase". Journal of Alloys and Compounds. 747: 854–860. doi:10.1016/j.jallcom.2018.03.064. ISSN 0925-8388. 
 Ando, D.; Ogawa, Y.; Suzuki, T.; Sutou, Y.; Koike, J. (2015-12-15). "Age-hardening effect by phase transformation of high Sc containing Mg alloy". Materials Letters. 161: 5–8. doi:10.1016/j.matlet.2015.06.057. ISSN 0167-577X.

References 

Living people
Japanese materials scientists
21st-century Japanese scientists
Japanese women scientists
Year of birth missing (living people)